Kutchicetus is an extinct genus of early whale of the family Remingtonocetidae that lived during Early-Middle Eocene (Lutetian and Ypresian) in what is now the coastal border of Pakistan and India (paleocoordinates ). Later authors, however, still accept both as separate genera.

Kutchicetus is smaller than other remingtonocetids, and probably is the smallest Eocene cetacean.  With its extremely narrow snout, it resembles Remingtonocetus and Dalanistes, but its strong tail distinguishes it from both Remingtonocetus and Andrewsiphius.  Its limbs were short.

Kutchicetus' vertebral formula is 7, 15, 8, 4, 20–25.  Its four fused sacral vertebrae were probably articulated to the hip bone and the numerous tail vertebrae were robust and elongated in contrast to its short and relatively gracile limb bones.  This morphology suggests that the tail played an important role in its locomotion, yet the proportions of the caudal-most vertebrae indicates Kutchicetus did not have flukes.

Kutchicetus vertebral proportions are unlike those of any other cetaceans but similar to those of some land-living or semi-aquatic mammals, such as Pachyaena and otters. Kutchicetus' limbs and sacrum were probably weight-bearing and it probably swam using undulatory movements like modern otters and most likely Ambulocetus.  This mode of locomotion represents a transitional stage in whale evolution.

See also

Evolution of cetaceans

Notes

References

 
 
 
  

Remingtonocetidae
Transitional fossils
Fossil taxa described in 2000
Prehistoric cetacean genera
Extinct mammals of Asia